Alfred Richards may refer to:
Alfred Bate Richards (1820–1876), journalist and author
Alfred Joseph Richards (1879–1953), recipient of the Victoria Cross
Alfred Newton Richards (1876–1966), pharmacologist
Alfred Richards (sportsman) (1867–1904), South African cricketer and rugby union player
Alfred N. Richards (ice skater); see United States Figure Skating Championships